Ghost in the Shell: S.A.C. 2nd GIG is the second season of the anime series Ghost in the Shell: Stand Alone Complex, created by Production I.G. It aired from January 1, 2004 to January 8, 2005. This season has three designations denoting the type of episode: "individual" (IN), "dividual" (DI) and "dual" (DU). IN episodes tie in with the Individual Eleven storyline; DI episodes are stand-alone episodes that may still be tied into other storylines; and DU episodes tie in with the Cabinet Intelligence Service & Goda story-line (though the two main storylines inter-relate). There are 11 IN, 11 DI and 4 DU episodes. In the United States the TV Parental Guidelines system rated the episodes from TV-14 to TV-MA. Critical response to the series was generally positive.

Plot
The second season, 2nd GIG, set two years after the events of the first season, explores the political and social ramifications of the two world wars that took place prior to the events of the series. At the time of the Third and the Fourth World Wars, about three million Asians became refugees and were invited into Japan as a source of cheap labor. These "invited refugees", based on the reclaimed island of Dejima, soon became unemployed in the post-war period, and their social unrest borders on outright war.

Section 9's involvement in the refugee issue begins after they successfully stop a hostage crisis caused by a domestic terrorist group known as the Individual Eleven, after which newly elected Prime Minister Yoko Kayabuki officially reinstates the organization. The group seems to be modeling themselves after the May 15 Incident, where a group of naval officers assassinated the Prime Minister and then gained the support of the public, and hope to stir up the refugees' spirits by fighting for them against the Japanese government.

The group also comes into contact with Kazundo Gōda, head of the Cabinet Intelligence Service, who gets assistance from the group in defusing several instances between the refugees as well as assisting him in transporting plutonium through Dejima, result in several failures and refugee deaths, further straining relations.

Section 9 ultimately discovers that Gōda has been manipulating both events behind the scenes, leaking the social virus that creates the Individual Eleven ideology and creating a new Stand Alone Complex, as well as the intentional failures with the refugees. However, he cannot account for the charismatic Hideo Kuze who genuinely believes in the best for the refugees and helps rally for their independence from Japan. Throughout the investigation, Kusanagi discovers she may know Kuze from her childhood. Ultimately, Gōda is found guilty of his part in the refugee incidents and killed before he can defect to the American Empire, but not before his ministrations also result in the death of Kuze.

Production
For the second season, Mamoru Oshii contributed with his ideas to the concept of the entire series and initial planning stages. In an interview, Oshii described his role in 2nd GIG as supervising the entire series and writing the plots for each episode. Dai Sato stated that they were initially going to concentrate on how Japan was going to participate in war after 9/11 as intended to portray a fictional future. But by the time they were working on the episodes, the Iraq War had already started and Japan's Self-Defense Force was sent to Iraq. During this time Japan also had an election. Sato continued to state that he created the "Individual Eleven" episodes to express irresponsibility of the Japanese people when they voted for the politicians that planned to send Japanese troops to Iraq and Afghanistan.

The opening theme for S.A.C. 2nd GIG is "Rise" performed by Origa (written by Tim Jensen), while the ending theme is "Living Inside the Shell" performed by Steve Conte (written by Shanti Snyder). 2nd GIG also used alternate opening and closing themes when it was re-broadcast on terrestrial television, with "Rise" was replaced by "CHRisTmas in the SiLenT ForeSt" performed by Ilaria Graziano (written by Shanti Snyder), and "Living Inside the Shell" was replaced by "Snyper", performed by Ilaria Graziano (written by Tim Jensen).

The second season of Stand Alone Complex aired on Animax from 1 January 2004 to 8 January 2005. The production of a second season was immediately decided after the first season's TV airing. The second season was initially hinted when Bandai has extended the episode list to 52 episodes at Otakon of 2003. On Halloween of 2003, Production I.G officially announced a second season for Ghost in the Shell: Stand Alone Complex.

It premiered on 1 January 2004 in Japan on SKY PerfecTV!'s Perfect Choice (Animax), on a pay-per-view basis. The series was later aired on the terrestrial Nippon TV from 6 April 2005. Animax also later aired the series across its other networks worldwide, including its English language networks in Southeast Asia and South Asia, as well as its other networks in Hong Kong, Taiwan, Latin America, and several other regions. 2nd GIG was also later aired in the United States on Cartoon Network's Adult Swim block. Bandai Visual owns the DVD distribution rights in Japan, while Anchor Bay Entertainment and Manga Entertainment owns the distribution rights in North America and Europe. The show began airing daily on AnimeCentral beginning 4 November 2007 in both English (two nightly screenings) and original Japanese (one late-night screening).

Reception
Chris Beveridge of Mania gave 2nd GIG an overall score of A praising its coloring stating, "Colors are gorgeous and solid, especially all the various areas of large soft colors that look to be amazingly solid and with no visible break-up even during pausing." Mark Thomas of Mania also gave it an overall score of A, stating: "It has plenty of good action and thought provoking plot points." Andy Patricio of IGN rated the first DVD volume 9/10 praised the animation, stating: "Artwork is richer; this is easily the best-looking anime Production I.G. has ever produced. CG is richer and more widely used. Animation is more complex and fluid, although it's still a little jerky, which is common in TV shows."

Joe Luscik of Animefringe ranked the series 4.5 out of 5 praising the animation stating it "is just awesome". Adam Arseneau of DVD Verdict praised the direction of the 2nd season compared to the first stating, "The tongue-in-cheek humor that made the show clever and endearing is still present, but the atmosphere feels more violent, more urban and dystopic, as if no longer afraid to address the social problems of the future."

The third DVD volume of the series was one of top-selling series in North America in 2006. It was also nominated for the Best Animated TV DVD honor category in the TV DVD Awards. In the American Anime Awards from 2007, Mary Elizabeth earned the award of "Best Actress".

Notes

References

Toonami
2004 anime television series debuts
2004 Japanese novels
2004 Japanese television seasons
2005 anime OVAs
2006 anime OVAs
2009 manga
2020 anime ONAs
Action anime and manga
Animated television series reboots
Animax original programming
Anime series based on manga
Bandai Entertainment anime titles
Bandai Visual
Brain transplantation in fiction
Cyberpunk anime and manga
Espionage in anime and manga
Fiction about memory erasure and alteration
Madman Entertainment anime
Nippon TV original programming
Postcyberpunk
Production I.G
Refugees and displaced people in fiction
Seinen manga
Stand Alone Complex
Television shows adapted into comics
Television shows adapted into films
Television shows adapted into novels
Television shows adapted into video games
Television series set in the 2030s
Terrorism in fiction
Thriller anime and manga